Andrea Corsaro (born 14 August 1958 in Vercelli) is an Italian politician.

Biography
He ran for Mayor of Vercelli at the 2004 local elections, supported by a centre-right coalition. He won and took his office on 28 June 2004. Corsaro joined The People of Freedom in 2009 and was elected for a second term at the 2009 local elections.

Corsaro ran again for Mayor of Vercelli in 2019 and he won at the second round against the outgoing mayor Maura Forte. He took office on 12 June 2019.

See also
2004 Italian local elections
2009 Italian local elections
2019 Italian local elections
List of mayors of Vercelli

References

External links
 
 

1958 births
Living people
Mayors of Vercelli
People from Vercelli
The People of Freedom politicians
Forza Italia (2013) politicians